Lutsenko is a Ukrainian surname which may refer to:

 Alexey Lutsenko,  Kazakh road race cyclist 
 Aleksander Lutsenko, Ukrainian Army Major, Ukraine Contingent commander in Kosovo
 Ihor Lutsenko (politician), Ukrainian politician and journalist
 Taras Lutsenko, Ukrainian football goalkeeper.
 Yevgeni Lutsenko (b. 1987), Russian football striker.
 Yevhen Lutsenko (b. 1980), Ukrainian football midfielder.
 Yuriy Lutsenko, Ukrainian politician and statesman.

See also
 

Ukrainian-language surnames